These are tables of congressional delegations from Maine to the United States Senate and United States House of Representatives.

The current dean of the Maine delegation is Senator Susan Collins, having served in the Senate since 1997.

U.S. Senate

U.S. House of Representatives

Current members

Historical delegations

1819–1821: 1 seat

1821–1833: 7 seats

1833–1843: 8 seats

1843–1853: 7 seats

1853–1863: 6 seats

1863–1883: 5 seats

1883–1933: 4 seats

1933–1963: 3 seats

1963–present: 2 seats

Key

See also

List of United States congressional districts
Maine's congressional districts
Political party strength in Maine

References

 Congressional Biographical Directory of the United States 1774–present
 Information from the Clerk of the U.S. House of Representatives

Maine
 
 
Congressional delegations
Politics of Maine